The Magic Gum Tree is a musical comedy written in 1932. The score and lyrics are the singular work of Adelaide pianist and composer Arline Sauer in 1932. Sauer, born Arline Estelle Lower, married her longtime mentor, the well known Sydney conductor, arranger and composer Charles Sauer in May 1924, had twin sons 1925, divorced 1947.

The piece is a work of Australiana featuring Australian animals and characters. Queensland reviewers felt it reminiscent of A. A. Milne, with pleasantly conceived music for solo and parts.

Synopsis
The plot involves an immigrant girl lost in the Australian outback. The girl falls asleep and meets a cast of dreamland characters. She is rescued by a group of ten Australian Aboriginal boys and returned safely home.

Musical numbers
Overture
Ten Little Aboriginals
Gumnut Pixies (dance)
Dear Little Wattle Blossom
Ko-a-la
Hail! Thou Fair Land (duet)
Ten Little Aboriginals (Finale)

The complete original published words and music (piano, voices) and dialogue may be viewed here

Performances
1934 Railway Institute, Sydney 
1935 Melbourne 
1935 Clermont, New South Wales 
1935 Newcastle, New South Wales 
1935 Lismore, New South Wales 
1935 Parkside, South Australia 
1936 Wayville, South Australia (selections) 
1937 Trangie, New South Wales 
1937 St George, Queensland 
1937 Coffs Harbour 
1937 Armidale, New South Wales 
1938 Bundarra, New South Wales 
1938 Maitland, New South Wales 
1939 Hobart, Tasmania 
1939 Canberra, ACT 
1940 Wellington, New South Wales 
1940 Carnarvon, Western Australia 
1941 Cairns, Queensland 
1941 Mount Barker, South Australia 
1941 Newcastle, New South Wales 
1942 Manilla, New South Wales 
1942 Mudgee, New South Wales 
1942 Rockhampton, New South Wales 
1946 Burnie, Tasmania 
1947 Forbes, New South Wales 
1950 Pinnaroo, South Australia

References

Australian musicals
1932 in Australia
Australian literature
Australian plays
20th-century Australian literature
Indigenous Australian theatre